Count Jan Krzysztof Tarnowski (1 January 1537 – 1 April 1567) was a Polish nobleman (szlachcic), Leliwa coat of arms. Son of Hetman Jan Tarnowski and Zofia née Szydłowiecka. He was married to Zofia Odrowąż since 1555, but had no issue. 
He was educated in the worldly affairs at the court of Ferdinand I, Holy Roman Emperor, at his father's great expense claimed Orzechowski.
He was owner of Tarnów, Wiewiórka, Przeworsk, Rożnów and Stare Sioło. 
Secretary of King Sigismund II Augustus since 1554, held offices of castellan of Wojnicz, starost of Sandomierz, Stryj and Dolina. Poor health disallowed Jan Krzysztof to have a substantial career in the military, Niesiecki said: King was shoving a lesser military command to him during the Muscovy war ( Northern Seven Years' War), but his health weak due to consumption prevented him from achieving knightly deeds.' 
Died prematurely, most likely to the ravages of tuberculosis, and was buried next to his father, Piotr Skarga presided over his funeral at Tarnów.
On his person ended the Tarnów line of the Tarnowski family clan.
Poet Jan Kochanowski dedicated his poem Chess to him.

References
Kasper Niesiecki,Polish Armorial'' - "Korona Polska przy złotey wolnosci starożytnemi Rycerstwa Polskiego y Wielkiego Xięstwa Litewskiego kleynotami naywyższymi Honorami Heroicznym, Męstwem y odwagą, Wytworną Nauką a naypierwey Cnotą, nauką Pobożnością, y Swiątobliwością ozdobiona Potomnym zaś wiekom na zaszczyt y nieśmiertelną sławę Pamiętnych w tey Oyczyźnie Synow podana TOM ... Przez X. Kaspra Niesieckego Societatis Jesu", Lwów (Lviv), 1738, vol 9, p 42.
Stanisław Orzechowski, Żywot i śmierć Jana Tarnowskiego (written 1561), Franciszek Bohomolec ed., Radom 1830. p. 62-100.

1537 births
1567 deaths
Counts of Poland
Polish Roman Catholics
Jan Krzysztof